Metello is a 1970 Italian drama film directed by Mauro Bolognini. It was entered into the 1970 Cannes Film Festival. It starred Massimo Ranieri as the title character.

Plot
During the end of the 19th century, young Metello decides to start a new life after the sudden loss of his parents. He meets a young girl, Ersilia. They get married and have a son. Metello becomes involved in a political activity at work and is arrested. He then lies that he won't be involved in the activity anymore, and as a result, has to flee town. He arrives at his new destination, and meets a middle-aged school teacher. He then has an affair with her, and as a result, she gives birth to his daughter. Towards the end of the film, Metello realizes that he really belongs back home with Ersilia.

Cast
 Massimo Ranieri as Metello
 Ottavia Piccolo as Ersilia
 Frank Wolff as Betto
 Tina Aumont as Idina
 Lucia Bosé as Viola
 Pino Colizzi as Renzoli
 Mariano Rigillo as Olindo
 Luigi Diberti as Lippi
 Manuela Andrei as Adele Salani
 Corrado Gaipa as Badolati
 Adolfo Geri as Del Bueno
 Claudio Biava as Moretti
 Franco Balducci as Chellini
 Steffen Zacharias as Pallesi
 Renzo Montagnani as Poldo Salani
 Sergio Ciulli

Awards
Massimo won the David di Donatello award for best actor, and  Ottavia Piccolo won the award for Best Actress at the 1970 Cannes Film Festival.

References

External links

1970 films
1970s historical drama films
1970s Italian-language films
Films set in Florence
Films directed by Mauro Bolognini
Films scored by Ennio Morricone
Films with screenplays by Ugo Pirro
Films with screenplays by Suso Cecchi d'Amico
Italian historical drama films
1970 drama films
1970s Italian films